Lois Ann Baxter (born 26 April 1947) is a British actress, known for playing Marie Stanton in Coronation Street from 1976 to 1977, and Lady Caroline in the period drama When the Boat Comes In.

Baxter was born in Bridgwater, Somerset, the daughter of Dr John Baxter and Christine D. Baxter (née Arkens). The family later moved to Worthen in Shropshire where her father was a GP for many years. She attended Shrewsbury High School from 1951 to 1959 when she left for Moreton Hall School.

Other appearances include: The Black Stuff, Spyder's Web, Within These Walls, Hadleigh, Z-Cars, Van der Valk, Crown Court, Doctor Who (in the serial as Madame Lamia in The Androids of Tara), Dickens of London (as Mary Hogarth, Charles Dickens' sister-in-law), All Creatures Great and Small, Angels, Minder, The Cleopatras, Bergerac, Tales of the Unexpected, Dempsey and Makepeace, Casualty, Holby City, The Bill and  The Comic Strip Presents. She has guest-starred in the audio dramas Sapphire and Steel: Cruel Immortality, Circular Time and The Adolescence of Time.  She appeared as QC Joyce in 2004's “Shadowplay”, S4:E11&12 of Waking the Dead.

Partial filmography
Ooh… You Are Awful (1972) - Jane Seaton (uncredited)
 Dickens of London (1976) - Mary Hogarth
Doll's Eye (1982) - Receptionist

References

External links
 
 Teach Yourself Acting: Lois Baxter
 RADA, Acting teaching staff: Lois Baxter

Living people
English television actresses
People educated at Shrewsbury High School, Shropshire
1947 births